In the GSM cellular mobile phone standard, timing advance (TA) value corresponds to the length of time a signal takes to reach the base station from a mobile phone. GSM uses TDMA technology in the radio interface to share a single frequency between several users, assigning sequential timeslots to the individual users sharing a frequency. Each user transmits periodically for less than one-eighth of the time within one of the eight timeslots. Since the users are at various distances from the base station and radio waves travel at the finite speed of light, the precise arrival-time within the slot can be used by the base station to determine the distance to the mobile phone.  The time at which the phone is allowed to transmit a burst of traffic within a timeslot must be adjusted accordingly to prevent collisions with adjacent users. Timing Advance (TA) is the variable controlling this adjustment.

Technical Specifications 3GPP TS 05.10 and TS 45.010 describe the TA value adjustment procedures.  The TA value is normally between 0 and 63, with each step representing an advance of one bit period (approximately 3.69 microseconds).  With radio waves travelling at about 300,000,000 metres per second (that is 300 metres per microsecond), one TA step then represents a change in round-trip distance (twice the propagation range) of about 1,100 metres. This means that the TA value changes for each 550-metre change in the range between a mobile and the base station.  This limit of 63 × 550 metres is the maximum 35 kilometres that a device can be from a base station and is the upper bound on cell placement distance.

A continually adjusted TA value avoids interference to and from other users in adjacent timeslots, thereby minimizing data loss and maintaining Mobile QoS (call quality-of-service).

Timing Advance is significant for privacy and communications security, as its combination with other variables can allow GSM localization to find the device's position and track the mobile phone user. TA is also used to adjust transmission power in space-division multiple access systems.

This limited the original range of a GSM cell site to 35 km as mandated by the duration of the standard timeslots defined in the GSM specification. The maximum distance is given by the maximum time that the signal from the mobile/BTS needs to reach the receiver of the mobile/BTS on time to be successfully heard. At the air interface the delay between the transmission of the downlink (BTS) and the uplink (mobile) has an offset of 3 timeslots. Until now the mobile station has used a timing advance to compensate for the propagation delay as the distance to the BTS changes. The timing advance values are coded by 6 bits, which gives the theoretical maximum BTS/mobile separation as 35 km.

By implementing the Extended Range feature, the BTS is able to receive the uplink signal in two adjacent timeslots instead of one. When the mobile station reaches its maximum timing advance, i.e. maximum range, the BTS expands its hearing window with an internal timing advance that gives the necessary time for the mobile to be heard by the BTS even from the extended distance. This extra advance is the duration of a single timeslot, a 156 bit period. This gives roughly 120 km range for a cell. and is implemented in sparsely populated areas and to reach islands for example.

References

External links 
 3GPP The current standardization body for GSM with free standards available.
 3GPP TS 05.10 Radio Subsystem Synchronization (for Phase 1, Phase 2, R96, R97, R98, R99).
 3GPP TS 45.010 Radio Subsystem Synchronization (for Rel-4, 5, 6).

GSM standard
3GPP standards